The 2001 season for the Gamecock men's soccer team was a memorable one that featured marquee wins over opponents such as Furman, Penn State, and Wake Forest. After receiving a first-round bye in the NCAA tournament, they were knocked out by UAB on a golden goal in overtime.

Roster

Results

See also 
 South Carolina Gamecocks

References 

South Carolina Gamecocks men's soccer seasons
South Carolina Gamecocks
South Carolina Gamecocks
South Carolina Gamecocks, soccer men's
South Carolina